Carbutt is a surname. Notable people with the surname include:

Edward Carbutt (1838–1905), English mechanical engineer and politician
Noel Carbutt (1895–1964), English cricketer
Paul Carbutt (1950–2004), English cyclist
Diana Parikian, born Diana Carbutt, (1926-2012),British antiquarian bookseller

See also
Carbutt Glacier, glacier of Antarctica